Walden is the largest of three villages of the town of Montgomery in Orange County, New York, United States. The population was 6,818 at the 2020 census. It has the ZIP Code 12586 and the 778 telephone exchange within the 845 area code. Walden is part of the Poughkeepsie−Newburgh−Middletown, NY Metropolitan Statistical Area as well as the larger New York−Newark−Bridgeport, NY-NJ-CT-PA Combined Statistical Area.

The precursor to the village began in the early 18th century as a mill town along the Wallkill River. One miller, Jacob Walden, was so successful the village that incorporated in the mid-19th century took its name from him. Later, it would be the village's three knife manufacturers that brought it growth and prosperity. They are gone today, but other industrial concerns remain. Walden is the home of Spence Engineering, a steam regulator manufacturer founded by Paulson Spence in 1926. He located his manufacturing facilities in Walden to serve the district steam heating loops in the northeast, especially ConEd in New York City. In 2019, Emerson Electric purchased Spence Engineering, ultimately moving it to Mexico in 2021 to improve their profitability. Walden was the home of the Thruway Markets hypermarket complex, which closed in 2013.

History

The area around present-day Walden was purchased in 1736 by Alexander Kidd, and settlers of Scots-Irish, English and German descent started arriving not long afterwards. It was the first settlement west of the Wallkill River, known at the time as Kidd's Town.

In the 1820s, a successful New York shipper named Jacob Walden convinced some of his business partners to finance the construction of wool mills on the river, attracted by the Great Falls as a source of power and the railroad connections at nearby Maybrook. He dammed the Wallkill above the falls, creating a power station that remains in use today, and his mill was a success.

Other wool-makers followed as the Industrial Revolution picked up steam and the growing population center became known instead as Walden's Mills. Most of them failed a few decades later, but their influence was such that the village incorporated in 1855 as Walden.

The village fathers needed to replace the mills as a source of employment, and began encouraging knife manufacturers to relocate from nearby Dutchess County to the vacant buildings, where the New York Knife Company made much of the cutlery employed by the Union Army during the U.S. Civil War.

After the war, other knifemakers came to Walden, too, and the village became colloquially known as Knifetown. Other industrial concerns, making products as diverse as engines and women's underwear, also set up shop.

In the early 1890s, President Grover Cleveland lowered tariffs on many imported goods, including knives. Competitively priced German cutlery began to flood the American market, and together with the Panic of 1893 and the economic slowdown that followed for several years, the knife companies and their owners went heavily into debt and it looked for a while as if they might not survive.

But in 1897 President William McKinley, a personal friend of Thomas Wilson Bradley of the U.S. Knife Company, pushed through the Dingley Tariff that restored the status quo ante. The knifemakers returned to profitability and were able to pay off their debts; and in gratitude Bradley had a statue of McKinley erected that remains in Walden today.

In the 1910s the facilities at the dam began to be primarily used for power and less for industry.

Walden's Main Street was the site of an active retail trade which included Millspaugh's Furniture as well as Roosa's Jewelers, both still in business. Lustig's Department Store, established by Carl Lustig in 1883, was the mainstay of Main Street until its closing in 1986.

The Depression was hard on many of the village's economic concerns, but the knifemakers persisted. However, after World War II they gradually became less prominent and moved as the rail connections they had depended on were replaced by trucking on the growing Interstate Highways. The last company making knives in the village, Imperial Schrade, closed down its factory after a 1957 fire and moved to nearby Ellenville afterwards, where it lasted until 2004. The ruins of the factory still stand behind Walden's most visible economic giant, the Thruway Markets hypermarket.

Walden retains some light industry and much of its working-class feel, enough for village residents to have gotten into a spat with WPDH-FM disc jockey the "Wolf" in the late 1990s over his constant on- and off-air joking about Walden as a redneck town.

Geography

The village's most notable geographical feature is the Wallkill River, which flows from the south to the north across the village and divides one-third of it from the rest. Within the eastern portion, Tin Brook, the Wallkill's major right tributary in New York, meanders across as well, forming part of the northern village boundary. There are two waterfalls and dams on the river within the village limits, known as the Great and Little Falls; and two auto bridges, the "high" (formally, the Walden Veterans' Memorial Bridge, which carries NY 52 through the village as West Main Street) and "low" (Oak Street) bridges).

The surrounding topography in the village is, correspondingly, gentle rolling hills of this section of the Great Appalachian Valley between the higher rises of the Shawangunk Ridge, visible to the west from some sections of the village, and the Hudson Highlands to the southwest.

Walden's growth began near the mills and later the knife-making plants, particularly the New York Knife Company, located on the steep east bank of the river just south of the Veterans' Memorial Bridge; the building's footings are still visible on the slope. The central business district of the village is today a few blocks to the east, along Main Street. Just to its south is the village hall and the main square. East Main Street, the section of 52 from the 208 junction to the village line, has seen many newer businesses locate there, including a small strip mall. There is also some scattered commercial presence along Orange Avenue (208 south of the junction), primarily professional office space. This parallels the village's remaining industrial presence along the railroad line to the east, which at its northern terminus abuts downtown to the southeast. Walden's other major commercial area is the Thruway Markets complex located along the river north of Oak Street, just south of the remains of the Walden Knife Company.

On the southern side of the village is the Fox Hill Bruderhof Community where about 250 community members live and work in their factories and the Plough Publishing House.

There are two schools, public Walden Elementary School on Orchard Street and Most Precious Blood Catholic school near the northern village line along Ulster Avenue.
The village includes public parks and a walking trail.
Bradley Park - along Albany Ave, on the high ground between Thruway Market and Ulster Ave (Rte 208), contains 4 baseball & 1 softball field (Home to the Walden Little League), 2 tennis courts, a playground, and a skateboard park.
Wooster Grove - along East Main St (Rte 52), surrounded by the Tin Brook, offers a large playground, indoor & outdoor basketball courts, a bandstand, an ice rink; the village's teen center is also here.
James Olley Park - at the end of Sherman Ave, includes a manufactured beach with public swimming and fishing, a small playground, a picnic grove, unimproved walking trails, and a summer recreation camp.
Alfred Place Park - the only park on the west side includes a small playground and basketball court.
Walden–Wallkill Rail Trail - beginning at Woosters Grove, a -long paved walking and biking trail linking the village to the hamlet of Wallkill in Ulster County.

Much of the remainder of the village is residential, with houses tending from modest and small near downtown, the river and railroad, to more expansive homes (such as the Victorians along the west side of Ulster Avenue) being found on the hills, newer development near the southwestern and eastern borders with the town, and 6 small apartment and townhouse complexes.

A large tract along the river south of the power station had remained undeveloped until very recently. A small area between McKinley Avenue, South Mountgomery Street and the river remains open, used for NYSEG's purposes. On the other end of the village, the sewage treatment plant is also in the middle of an undeveloped area.

Climate
Walden has a humid continental climate, and tends to be significantly cooler than Manhattan, especially at night.

Demographics

As of the census of 2020, there were 6,818 people, 2,473 households, and 1,577 families residing in the village.

Economy

The knife making plants are gone, but other light-industrial concerns remain along the rail spur. The growing service sector is most strongly represented by two regional banks, Walden Federal and Walden Savings Bank, are based in the village (though the latter has moved to new headquarters at Scotts Corners, the 17K/208 intersection).

Retailing has long been a strong point for the village. The opening of Thruway Markets in 1955 filled the need not only for a supermarket but the entire big box sector, long before it existed in the country at large. While it eventually drove smaller stores from Main Street, it remains a substantial part of the village's tax base and a major draw for consumers from outside not only Walden but the Town of Montgomery (particularly the nearby hamlet of Wallkill, which has no large retailers of its own), despite the openings of chain supermarkets in several nearby communities. The Thruway complex also boasts an outdoor-recreation store, tire-repair shop and the oldest of the village's three Chinese restaurants. In 2013, Thruway's owners closed the supermarket and hardware store after selling that space to the Maine-based Hannaford supermarket chain. Building of the new Hannaford supermarket is complete. The Ace hardware store has also since reopened.

While vacant space remains on Main Street, specialty stores and restaurants have managed to thrive there. Millspaugh Furniture, founded in Walden (but with another outlet in Poughkeepsie), is another popular draw for out-of-town shoppers due to its long history in the area and reputation for quality merchandise. National and regional chain stores once had little presence in Walden beyond two gas stations along the 52/208 section of Main Street, but in the last decade the amount of convenience stores has doubled with the addition of a Stewart's along East Main Street, and fast-food chains Subway and Dunkin' Donuts have found space nearby.

Outside of jobs at the enterprises in the village, most residents work in the area. The nearby interstate and its associated "Golden Triangle" (with the New York State Thruway/I-87 and NY 17 (the future I-86) provide many jobs in transportation and distribution, particularly at Maybrook's Yellow Freight facility and the large Staples warehouse just north of I-84. Local government agencies, and some state ones such as the Department of Correctional Services, also employ residents. More recently, residents of the newer housing have been commuters traveling to jobs in New York City or other areas close to it.

Government

As a village of the Town of Montgomery, Walden residents are taxpayers and electors in both.

The village has seven elected officials, a village board consisting of the mayor and six nonpartisan trustees, per the New York State Village Law. Most of the executive functions are handled by the village manager, who serves at the board's pleasure.

Walden has had this system of government since 1964. A 1972 referendum to return to a strong-mayor system was defeated.

The village has its own police force, which provides 24-hour protection for residents; a public works department which maintains roads, water and sewer lines; a skate park in Bradley Park which was built in fall 2006 due to the ongoing complaints from older residents about all the skateboarders, a recreation department which maintains several parks within the village, including one with a pond in which swimming is permitted; and a village court presided over by an elected justice. Fire protection is provided for the village and surrounding fire district by the Walden Fire Department.

The Village Hall, pictured left, housed both the Walden Fire Department and Police Station until 1994 when the Fire District moved to a newly constructed firehouse at 230 Old Orange Avenue, near the edge of the village. Since then, the police station on the ground floor has grown from a tiny office and a few cells to nearly encompassing the entire ground floor. Fire department meeting rooms on the second story have been converted since then to a children's section of the local Josephine-Louise Library.

Infrastructure

Transportation
Two state highways and two county roads serve Walden. Route 52 crosses the town from east to west, providing connections to Newburgh,  in the former direction and Pine Bush, the Shawangunks and the Catskills in the latter. NY 208 crosses from north to south, with the nearest settlements in each direction being Wallkill and Maybrook, respectively. The two share a brief block in the center of town.
County routes 23 (River Road) and 75 (Coldenham Road) connect to 17K at Montgomery to the southwest and the hamlet of Coldenham to the southeast, respectively.

The remaining spur of the old Wallkill Valley Railroad, now operated by Norfolk Southern, serves several businesses in the village and ends just short of East Main Street. There have been suggestions that commuter rail service via the Metro-North Port Jervis Line, where the spur connects at Campbell Hall, currently the nearest passenger rail station, be initiated. Metro-North rail service directly into New York City is available just across the Hudson River from Newburgh at Beacon and other stations on the Hudson Line. Amtrak stops at Poughkeepsie, the Hudson Line's northern terminus. The nearest airport to Walden, Orange County Airport, is a general aviation facility just south of Montgomery. Commercial airlines, both freight and passenger, fly out of Stewart International Airport.

Short Line serves Walden on its route from Newburgh to Middletown.

References

External links
Walden Police Department
Village website

Villages in New York (state)
Populated places established in 1736
Villages in Orange County, New York
Wallkill River
Poughkeepsie–Newburgh–Middletown metropolitan area